Chryseobacterium solincola  is a Gram-negative, strictly aerobic halotolerant and psychrotolerant bacteria from the genus of Chryseobacterium which has been isolated from soil which was polluted with hydrocarbon in Meftah in Algeria.

References

Further reading

External links
Type strain of Chryseobacterium solincola at BacDive -  the Bacterial Diversity Metadatabase

solincola
Bacteria described in 2010
Psychrophiles